Ohon'ly (Russian: Огоньки́, Ukrainian: Орта́-Эли́, Crimean Tatar: Orta Eli)  is a village in the district of Lenine Raion in Crimea.

Georgraphy 
Ohon'ky is located in the south-east of the district and the Kerch Peninsula, in an unnamed gully at its confluence from the north into Tobechytske Lake.

References 

Populated coastal places in Ukraine